Karl Gustav Stricker Brøndsted (13 December 1915 – 27 February 1945) was a member of the Danish resistance executed by the German occupying power.

Biography 

Brøndsted was born in Hellerup 13 December 1915 as son of teacher cand. theol. Gustav Hans Brøndsted and wife Frederikke Agathe née Stricker and baptized in Hellerup church on 5 March the following year.

On 27 February 1945 Brøndsted and nine other resistance members were executed in Ryvangen.

After his death 

After a memorial service in Hellerup church 28 August 1945 Brøndsted was the following day together with 105 other victims of the occupation given a state funeral in the memorial park founded at the execution site in Ryvangen. Bishop Hans Fuglsang-Damgaard led the service with participation from the royal family, the government and representatives of the resistance movement.

The following year his father published the book Derfor blev han Frihedskæmper – Til minde om Karl Gustav Stricker Brøndsted.

References 

1915 births
1945 deaths
Danish resistance members
Danish people executed by Nazi Germany
Resistance members killed by Nazi Germany
People from Gentofte Municipality
People executed by Nazi Germany by firing squad